Culmination is an album by multi-instrumentalist and composer Sam Rivers. It was recorded during September 1998 at Systems Two Recording Studio in Brooklyn, New York, and was released in 1999 by BMG France. On the album, Rivers is joined by members of the Rivbea All-star Orchestra: saxophonists Greg Osby, Steve Coleman, Chico Freeman, Gary Thomas, and Hamiet Bluiett, trumpeters Baikida Carroll, James Zollar, Ralph Alessi, and Ravi Best, trombonists Art Baron, Joseph Bowie, and Ray Anderson, baritone horn player Joseph Daley, tubist Bob Stewart, bassist Doug Mathews, and drummer Anthony Cole.

Reception

The album was nominated for "Best Large Jazz Ensemble Album" at the 43rd Annual Grammy Awards.

In a review for AllMusic, Scott Yanow wrote: "The music, which is frequently atonal, has so much going on at times that it will take several listens to comprehend everything... [it] is remarkable in ways and well worth acquiring by free jazz collectors."

Mark Corroto of All About Jazz stated that Rivers' "six-to thirteen-minute big band songs are wondrous treats. By shortening the solos and compacting the arrangements he seems to be bringing 'pop' hits back to the jazz orchestra." AAJ'''s David Adler commented: "You can practically hear the 70s loft scene come to life as Rivers and the other strong soloists on this record... take turns navigating the atonal contours of these compositions. Yet another elliptically eloquent statement from Rivers, one of the most refreshingly radical improvisers of our time."

Writing for JazzTimes'', Larry Appelbaum noted that the album "is likely to end up on many year-end best-of lists," and remarked: "Though many of the densely textured pieces have similar tempos and dynamics, they are all rhythmically and harmonically adventurous... Just about everyone in this 16-piece orchestra is a leader, so it’s no surprise that Rivers is generous with the solo space... It's clear that, at age 77, Sam Rivers shows no signs of slowing down."

Track listing
All tracks composed by Sam Rivers.

 "Spectrum" – 7:22
 "Bubbles" – 8:27
 "Revelation" – 10:36
 "Culmination" – 8:12
 "Ripples" – 13:38
 "Neptune" – 5:53
 "Riffin'" – 6:26

Personnel 
 Sam Rivers – soprano saxophone, tenor saxophone, flute
 Greg Osby – alto saxophone
 Steve Coleman – alto saxophone
 Chico Freeman – tenor saxophone
 Gary Thomas – tenor saxophone
 Hamiet Bluiett – baritone saxophone
 Baikida Carroll – trumpet
 James Zollar – trumpet
 Ralph Alessi – trumpet
 Ravi Best – trumpet
 Art Baron – trombone
 Joseph Bowie – trombone
 Ray Anderson – trombone
 Joseph Daley – baritone horn
 Bob Stewart – tuba
 Doug Mathews – bass
 Anthony Cole – drums

References

1999 albums
Sam Rivers (jazz musician) albums